Linear Technology Corporation was an American semiconductor company that designed, manufactured and marketed high performance analog integrated circuits. Applications for the company's products included telecommunications, cellular telephones, networking products, notebook and desktop computers, video/multimedia, industrial instrumentation, automotive electronics, factory automation, process control, military and space systems.

The company was founded in 1981 by Robert H. Swanson, Jr. and Robert C. Dobkin.

In July 2016, Analog Devices agreed to buy Linear Technology for 14.8 billion dollars. This acquisition was finalized on March 10, 2017. The Linear name survives as the "Power by Linear" brand that is used to market the combined power management portfolios of Linear Technology and Analog Devices.

Products

As of August 2010, the company made over 7500 products, which they organized into seven product categories: data conversion (analog to digital converters, digital to analog converters), signal conditioning (operational amplifiers, comparators, voltage references), power management (switching regulators, linear regulators, battery management, LED drivers), interface (RS232, RS485), radio frequency (mixers, quadrature modulators), oscillators, and space and military ICs.

The company maintained LTspice, a freely downloadable version of SPICE that includes schematic capture.

Locations
Corporate headquarters were in Milpitas, California.  In the United States, the company had design centers in Phoenix, Arizona; Grass Valley, California; Santa Barbara, California; Colorado Springs, Colorado; North Chelmsford, Massachusetts; Manchester, New Hampshire; Cary, North Carolina; Plano, Texas; and Burlington, Vermont. It also had centers in Munich and Singapore.

The company's wafer fabrication facilities were located in Camas, Washington and Milpitas, California.

See also
Jim Williams

References

External links

 

Technology companies based in the San Francisco Bay Area
Companies based in Milpitas, California
Electronics companies established in 1981
American companies established in 1981
1981 establishments in California
2017 mergers and acquisitions
Semiconductor companies of the United States
American corporate subsidiaries